"Petite fille" is a song by French singer Johnny Hallyday. It was released in 1967 on an EP and also appeared on Hallyday's that year's album Johnny 67.

Writing and composition 
The song was written for Johnny Hallyday by Micky Jones and Tommy Brown, respectively the guitarist and the drummer in Hallyday's accompanying band. The French lyrics were written by Georges Aber.

Track listing 
7-inch EP Philips 437.371 (1967, France, Belgium, etc.)
A1. "Petite fille" (2:39)
A2. "Je n'ai jamais rien demandé" (2:52)
B1. "C'est mon imagination" (3:08)
B2. "Lettre de fans" (2:15)

7-inch single Philips 373,989 (1967, Canada)
A. "Petite fille" ("Julien Waites")
B. "Aussi dur que du bois" ("Knock on Wood")

7-inch promo single Philips B 370.462 F (1967, France)
A. "Petite fille"
B. "Pourquoi as-tu peur de la vie"

Charts

English version 
In the same year Jones and Brown (as the band State of Micky & Tommy) released the song in English (under the title "Julien Waites").

References

External links 
 Johnny Hallyday – "Petite fille" (EP) at Discogs

1967 songs
1967 singles
1967 EPs
French songs
Johnny Hallyday songs
Philips Records singles
Songs written by Mick Jones (Foreigner)
Songs written by Georges Aber
Songs written by Tommy Brown (singer)